Little Mountain is the third studio album from Said the Whale released March 6, 2012. The album, according to Vancouver Weekly, is "Said The Whale's most balanced offering yet" and is the first creation of the band that expands their horizons beyond talking about how much they love Vancouver (claimed to be a result of the band's first United States tour). "Heavy Ceiling" and "Loveless" both ranked in the top 30 of the Canadian Active Rock and Alternative Rock Charts, with the album itself reaching No. 19.

Track listing

Singles

References 

2012 albums
Said the Whale albums